Wanuni (Aymara wanu dung, fertilizer, -ni a suffix, "the one with dung", also spelled Huanuni) is a  mountain in the Bolivian Andes. It is located in the La Paz Department, Loayza Province, Cairoma Municipality, northwest of Cairoma. Wanuni lies southwest of Llallawa, northwest of Wayra Willk'i and southeast of Liqiliqini.

References 

Mountains of La Paz Department (Bolivia)